Gammarus obruki is a species of freshwater amphipod, collected from İnderesi Cave, Bartın Province, Turkey. This species belongs to the Gammarus pulex-group. The most discriminant characters of this species are the presence of prolonged extremities, including a very long antennae, up to 52 segmented flagella, a densely setose fifth peduncle, l flagellar segments of antenna, and a fourth peduncle segment that has no long setae.

References

obruki
Endemic fauna of Turkey
Freshwater crustaceans of Asia
Crustaceans described in 2012